Bloudruk (Afrikaans: "Blueprint"), the second studio album by Johannes Kerkorrel, was released in 1992.

Kerkorrel sang the track Halala Afrika (Rejoice Africa) at Nelson Mandela's presidential inauguration ceremony in 1994.

Track listing

 Halala Afrika
 Ballade van 'n Mynwerker
 Sy Beweeg
 Somer
 Dêrde Wereld
 Revolusie
 Pers Reën
 Toekomsrap
 Hoe Ek Voel
 Blou Aarde

Personnel
 Mauritz Lotz: Acoustic and electric guitars 
 Didi Kriel: Keyboards, additional bass (electric and stand-up)
 Ian Herman: Drums
 Victor Masondo: Electric and stand-up bass 
 Mike Faure: Saxophone
 Lloyd Ross: Acoustic and electric guitars, lead guitar on "Blou Aarde"
 Hanepoot Van Tonder 
 Willem Moller: Acoustic and electric guitars
 Amanda Strydom: Backing vocals
 Reuben Samuels: Drums, percussion
 Cutt Glass: Backing vocals
 Nippy Cripwell du Toit: Electric and stand-up bass
 Lloyd Martin: Drums, percussion

References

1992 albums
Johannes Kerkorrel albums